La sonrisa del Diablo is a Mexican telenovela produced by Televisa and transmitted by Telesistema Mexicano in 1970.

Cast 
Maricruz Olivier as Deborah
Narciso Busquets as Salvador
Norma Herrera
Andrés García
Rosenda Monteros
Fanny Schiller
Jorge Vargas

References

External links 

Mexican telenovelas
1970 telenovelas
Televisa telenovelas
Spanish-language telenovelas
1970 Mexican television series debuts
1970 Mexican television series endings